The 2018–19 season was Plymouth Argyle's second consecutive season in League One and their 133rd year in existence. Along with competing in League One, the club participated in the FA Cup, EFL Cup and EFL Trophy. The season covers the period from 1 July 2018 to 30 June 2019.

First-Team Squad

Statistics

|-
!colspan=14|Players out on loan:

|-
!colspan=14|Players who left the club:

|}

Goals record

Disciplinary record

Transfers

Transfers in

Transfers out

Loans in

Loans out

Competitions

Friendlies
On 10 May 2018, Plymouth Argyle announced eight pre-season friendlies for July. These were extended into ten friendlies when a tour of The Netherlands was announced in early July.

League One

League table

Results summary

Results by matchday

Matches
On 21 June 2018, the League One fixtures for the forthcoming season were announced.

FA Cup

The first round draw was made live on BBC by Dennis Wise and Dion Dublin on 22 October. The draw for the second round was made live on BBC and BT by Mark Schwarzer and Glenn Murray on 12 November.

EFL Cup

On 15 June 2018, the draw for the first round was made in Vietnam.

EFL Trophy
On 13 July 2018, the initial group stage draw bar the U21 invited clubs was announced.

References

Plymouth Argyle
Plymouth Argyle F.C. seasons